Ricardo Gonzalo Pedro Montalbán y Merino, KSG (November 25, 1920 – January 14, 2009) was a Mexican and American film and television actor. Montalbán's career spanned seven decades, during which he became known for performances in a variety of genres, from crime and drama to musicals and comedy. 

Later in his career, Montalbán portrayed Armando in the Planet of the Apes film series from the early 1970s, starring in both Escape from the Planet of the Apes (1971) and Conquest of the Planet of the Apes (1972). As the villain Khan Noonien Singh, a genetically enhanced human, he starred in both the original Star Trek television series (1967) and the film Star Trek II: The Wrath of Khan (1982). During the 1970s and 1980s, he was a spokesman in automobile advertisements for Chrysler, including those in which he extolled the "rich Corinthian leather" used for the Cordoba's interior.

Montalbán played Mr. Roarke on the television series Fantasy Island (1977–1984). He won an Emmy Award for his role in the miniseries How the West Was Won (1978), and a Lifetime Achievement Award from the Screen Actors Guild in 1993. Montalbán was professionally active into his 80s, providing voices for animated films and commercials and appearing as Grandfather Valentin in the Spy Kids franchise.

Early life
Montalbán was born on November 25, 1920, in Mexico City, and grew up in Torreón, the son of Spanish immigrants Ricarda Merino Jiménez and Genaro Balbino Montalbán Busano, a store manager, who raised him as a Catholic. He was born with an arteriovenous malformation (AVM) in his spine. Montalbán had a sister, Carmen, and two brothers, Pedro and Carlos. As a teenager, he moved to Los Angeles to live with Carlos. They moved to New York City in 1940, and Montalbán earned a minor role in the play Her Cardboard Lover.

Career

Short films
In 1941, Montalbán appeared in three-minute musicals produced for the Soundies film jukeboxes. He appeared in many of the New York–produced Soundies as an extra or as a member of a singing chorus (usually billed as Men and Maids of Melody), although he had the lead role in He's a Latin from Staten Island (1941), in which he (billed simply as "Ricardo") played the title role of a guitar-strumming gigolo, accompanied by an offscreen vocal by Gus Van.

Mexican films
Later in 1941, Montalbán returned to Mexico after learning that his mother was dying. There, he acted in a dozen Spanish-language films and became a star in his homeland.

He had an uncredited appearance in a version of The Three Musketeers (1942) starring Cantinflas. He can be glimpsed in El verdugo de Sevilla (1942), The Saint That Forged a Country (1942) starring Ramon Navarro, and La razón de la culpa (1943).

Stardom in Mexico
Montalbán became a star in Mexico in Santa (1943), which was directed by a Hollywood expat, Norman Foster. He followed it with a support role in Cinco fueron escogidos (1943).

Some American filmmakers shot a movie in Mexico about Yugoslavia in World War II, Five Were Chosen (1944). Montalbán had a support role.

Foster gave him a second lead role in The Escape (1944) aka La Fuga. Montalban had the star role in Cadetes de la naval (1945), Nosotros (1945), and The Hour of Truth (1945), the latter a bullfighting drama also directed by Foster.

Montalban was in The House of the Fox (1945), Pepita Jimenez (1946), and Fantasía ranchera (1947).

Metro-Goldwyn-Mayer

Montalbán's films had been seen by Metro-Goldwyn-Mayer who were looking for someone to play a bullfighter opposite Esther Williams in Fiesta (1947), shot in Mexico. Montalbán was cast and the movie was very popular; Metro-Goldwyn-Mayer signed him to a long-term contract.

The studio re-teamed him with Williams in On an Island with You (1948). He had a dance number in the Frank Sinatra musical The Kissing Bandit (1948), then did a third film with Williams, Neptune's Daughter (1949), in which they dueted on "Baby It's Cold Outside".

Montalbán's first leading role was in the film noir Border Incident (1949) with actor George Murphy, directed by Anthony Mann. It was one of a number of lower budgeted films made at the studio under Dore Schary and earned a small loss. Montalbán was the first Hispanic actor to appear on the front cover of Life magazine on November 21, 1949. "I was king for a week," he said later. "I thought the offers would flood in, but after a week—nothing."

Montalban was one of several soldiers in the William Wellman war film Battleground (1949), a huge success at the box office. He was given another star role in Mystery Street (1950), playing a detective in a film noir directed by John Sturges. It was a box office disappointment.

Sturges also directed Right Cross (1950) with Montalbán, Dick Powell and June Allyson. Montalbán and Jane Powell made the musical Two Weeks with Love (1950), which was a minor hit.

Universal borrowed Montalbán and Cyd Charisse for a swashbuckler, The Mark of the Renegade (1951). Back at Metro-Goldwyn-Mayer, he was second billed to Clark Gable in Across the Wide Missouri (1951), directed by Wellman. The film was a big hit, although Montalbán was injured during shooting.

The studio teamed him and Shelley Winters in My Man and I (1952) where he played a laborer under the direction of Wellman; it was a big flop.

Montalbán was one of several names in Sombrero (1953), shot in Mexico. Montalbán was Lana Turner's leading man in Latin Lovers (1953). Both films lost money and Metro-Goldwyn-Mayer let him go.

He later said, "I played caricatures of what a Latin is supposed to be like. In reality, we are family men. I should have had the courage of Dolores Del Rio who returned to Mexico and made her best movies there."

B movies, television, and Broadway
Montalbán did a swashbuckler for Sam Katzman, The Saracen Blade (1954), then returned to Mexico to star in Untouched (1954).

He travelled to Italy to make The Queen of Babylon (1954) with Rhonda Fleming, then returned to Mexico to make the US-financed A Life in the Balance (1955) with Anne Bancroft. He bought a story for himself, Green Shadows, but it appears to have not been made.

Montalbán began working in television, guest-starring on shows such as General Electric Theater, The Ford Television Theatre, Celebrity Playhouse, Climax!, The 20th Century-Fox Hour (versions of Broken Arrow and Five Fingers), Chevron Hall of Stars, Wagon Train, and Schlitz Playhouse.

In 1955, he appeared on Broadway in Seventh Heaven with Gloria DeHaven but it ran for only forty-four performances. In Hollywood, he appeared in the thriller for Allied Artists, Three for Jamie Dawn (1956).

Montalbán returned to Italy for Desert Warrior (1957), then had his first role in an "A" Hollywood film for a number of years in Sayonara (1957), in which he played a Japanese dancer. He later said, "I was and still am very pleased with my performance and very much saddened by this picture. I was hoping for an Academy Award nomination, but unfortunately, most of my scenes ended up on the cutting-room floor."

From 1957 to 1959, Montalbán starred in the Broadway musical Jamaica, singing several light-hearted calypso numbers opposite Lena Horne, which ran for 555 performances. His performance earned him a Tony Award nomination.

Montalbán continued to guest-star on shows such as Colgate Theatre and Playhouse 90. When Jamaica ended, he guest-starred in Riverboat, Adventures in Paradise, Startime, Death Valley Days, Bonanza, Alfred Hitchcock Presents, The Christophers, The Dinah Shore Chevy Show, The Loretta Young Show (several times), Zorro, The Untouchables, Checkmate, Cain's Hundred, and The Lloyd Bridges Show.

Montalbán could also be seen in Let No Man Write My Epitaph (1960); the TV remake of Rashomon (1960) directed by Sidney Lumet; Rage of the Buccaneers (1961), an Italian swashbuckler in which Montalbán had a lead role alongside Vincent Price; Hemingway's Adventures of a Young Man (1962); The Reluctant Saint (1963) with Maximillian Schell; and Love is a Ball (1963) with Glenn Ford, playing a French duke. He was the Native American leader Little Wolf in Cheyenne Autumn (1964) directed by John Ford, did the TV version of The Fantasticks (1964), and returned to Mexico to make ¡Buenas noches, año nuevo! (1964).

He was mostly seen, though, on television in Alcoa Premiere, The Dick Powell Theatre, Ben Casey, The Greatest Show on Earth, The Lieutenant, The Great Adventure, Slattery's People, The Defenders, The Rogues, Burke's Law, Dr. Kildare, and The Man from U.N.C.L.E..

Montalbán had supporting roles in The Money Trap (1965) with Ford, directed by Burt Kennedy, Madame X (1966) with Turner for producer Ross Hunter, and The Singing Nun (1966) with Debbie Reynolds at MGM.

He guest-starred in The Long, Hot Summer, Daniel Boone, The Wild Wild West, Insight, Combat!, Mission: Impossible, I Spy, Hawaii Five-O (playing a Japanese-American crime boss ), and Bob Hope Presents the Chrysler Theatre.

In 1965, he toured in The King and I. "'I think every actor loves the stage,' he said in 1991. 'The pros are that it is the actor's medium; there's no way your scene is going to end up on the cutting-room floor, and it's up to you to get and keep the attention of the audience by the truth of your performance.'"

He appeared in the TV movies Alice Through the Looking Glass (1966) (for which his fee was $10,000, equivalent to $ today.) and Code Name: Heraclitus (1967), and the features The Longest Hundred Miles (1967), Sol Madrid (1968), and Blue (1968). He also guest-starred on "Space Seed", an episode of Star Trek. "I'm like a doctor on 24-hour call," he said in a 1967 interview. "I don't turn anything down."

Montalbán also starred in radio, such as on the internationally syndicated program Lobo del Mar (Seawolf), in which he was cast as the captain of a vessel that became part of some adventure at each port it visited. This 30-minute weekly show aired in many Spanish-speaking countries until the early 1970s.

Television movies
Montalbán guest-starred in The Felony Squad, Ironside, It Takes a Thief, and The High Chaparral. He did the TV movies The Pigeon (1969), The Desperate Mission (1969) (playing Joaquin Murrieta), and Black Water Gold (1970), and had a supporting role in the big screen film version of Sweet Charity (1969).

Montalbán was in The Name of the Game; Gunsmoke; Dan August; Bracken's World; Marcus Welby, M.D.; The Virginian; The Doris Day Show; Sarge; and Nichols. He did the TV movies The Aquarians (1970), The Face of Fear (1971), and Fireball Forward (1972) and the features The Devil's Backbone (1971), Escape from the Planet of the Apes (1971), Conquest of the Planet of the Apes, and The Train Robbers (1973) (directed by Kennedy).

Montalbán continued to guest-star on shows like O'Hara, U.S. Treasury; Here's Lucy; and Griff.

In 1972, Montalbán co-founded the Screen Actors Guild Ethnic Minority Committee with actors Carmen Zapata, Henry Darrow and Edith Diaz. In 1973, he returned to Broadway for a revival of Don Juan in Hell. He did the TV movies Wonder Woman (1974), The Mark of Zorro (1974), McNaughton's Daughter (1976), and guest-starred on Switch and Columbo.
 
In 1975, he was chosen as the television spokesman for the new Chrysler Cordoba. The car became a successful model, and over the following several years, was heavily advertised; his mellifluous delivery of a line praising the "soft" or "rich Corinthian leather" upholstery of the car's interior, often misquoted as "fine Corinthian leather,” became famous and was much parodied, and Montalbán subsequently became a favorite subject of impersonators. For example, Eugene Levy frequently impersonated him on SCTV, as did Dan Aykroyd on Saturday Night Live. In 1986, he was featured in a magazine advertisement for the new Chrysler New Yorker.

Montalbán is in Won Ton Ton: The Dog Who Saved Hollywood (1976), and Joe Panther (1976) and had a regular role in a short lived series Executive Suite (1976). He guest-starred on Police Story and did the TV movies Mission to Glory: A True Story (1977), Captains Courageous (1977), as well as the miniseries How the West Was Won (1978).

Fantasy Island and Star Trek II

Montalbán's best-known television role was that of Mr. Roarke on the television series Fantasy Island, which he played from 1977 until 1984. For a while, the series was one of the most popular on television, and his character as well as that of his sidekick, Tattoo (played by Hervé Villechaize), became popular icons.

Another of his well-known roles was that of Khan Noonien Singh in Star Trek II: The Wrath of Khan (1982), in which he reprised a role that he had originated in the episode of Star Trek titled "Space Seed" (1967). Early rumors suggested Montalbán wore prosthetic muscles on his chest during filming of Star Trek II to appear more muscular. Director Nicholas Meyer replied that even in his sixties Montalbán, who had a vigorous training regimen, was "one strong cookie", and that his real chest was seen on film. Khan's costume was specifically designed to display Montalbán's physique. 

His performance as Khan was widely praised. Critic Christopher Null called Khan the "greatest role of Montalbán's career". New Yorker critic Pauline Kael said Montalbán's performance as Khan "was the only validation he has ever had of his power to command the big screen". Roger Ebert of The Chicago Sun-Times wrote how this type of film was "only as good as its villain" and Montalbán's decision to avoid overacting and instead play the character as motivated by "deeply wounded pride" inspired a measure of sympathy in the audience. 

Montalbán agreed to take the role for a significant pay cut, since by his own admission, he relished reprising the role, and his only regret was that he and William Shatner never interacted – the characters never meet face to face, except through video communication – as their scenes were filmed several months apart in order to accommodate Montalbán's schedule for Fantasy Island. When Montalbán guest-starred in the Family Guy episode "McStroke" as a genetically engineered cow, his character made several references to his role as Khan, and similar references were made in his role as Guitierrez on the animated series Freakazoid. After a cameo in Cannonball Run II (1984), Montalbán had a guest role in Dynasty which led to a regular role in its spin-off The Colbys.

Montalbán played the villain in The Naked Gun: From the Files of Police Squad! (1988) and guest-starred in B.L. Stryker; Murder, She Wrote; Hearts Are Wild; and The Golden Palace.

Injury
During the filming of the film Across the Wide Missouri (1951), Montalbán was thrown from his horse, knocked unconscious, and trampled by another horse, which aggravated his arteriovenous malformation and resulted in a traumatic back injury that never healed. The pain increased as he aged, and in 1993, he underwent over nine hours of spinal surgery that left his body below the waist impaired and requiring the use of mobility aids.

Despite constant pain, he continued to perform, providing voices for animated films and supporting his Nosotros Foundation. Filmmaker Robert Rodriguez created a role in his Spy Kids film series specifically for Montalbán.

He had another regular series with Heaven Help Us (1994), but it only lasted 14 episodes.

In 1997, Montalbán sued the producers of Fantasy Island claiming he was entitled to five percent of the profits. The producers claimed the show had lost $11 million. The matter settled out of court.

Montalbán also narrated several historical documentaries including the Spanish version of the National Park Service's history of Pecos Pueblo for Pecos National Historical Park.

Montalban had a supporting role in two big hits Spy Kids 2: Island of Lost Dreams (2002) and Spy Kids 3-D: Game Over (2003).

Prior to his death in January 2009, Montalbán recorded the voice for a guest character in an episode of the animated series American Dad!, in which main character Roger becomes the dictator of a South American country. According to executive producer Mike Barker, it was his last role after The Ant Bully.

Nosotros Foundation and Montalbán Theatre

The way he was asked to portray Mexicans disturbed him, so Montalbán, along with Richard Hernandez, Val de Vargas, Rodolfo Hoyos Jr., Carlos Rivas, Tony de Marco, and Henry Darrow, established the Nosotros ("We") Foundation in 1970 to advocate for Latinos in the movie and television industries. He served as its first president, and was quoted as saying: "I received tremendous support, but there also were some negative repercussions. I was accused of being a militant, and as a result I lost jobs." Ironically, the Nosotros Foundation and he were instrumental in taking roles away from Nico Minardos, a Greek-American actor who in the 1970s often played Latino roles because of his appearance and accent. Minardos similarly became outspoken, and according to his agent and others, it cost him a recurring role as a Mexican mayor in an episode of Alias Smith and Jones.

The foundation created the Golden Eagle Awards, an annual awards show highlighting Latino actors. The awards are presented in conjunction with the Nosotros American Latino Film Festival, held at the Ricardo Montalbán Theatre in Hollywood.

The Nosotros Foundation and the Ricardo Montalbán Foundation agreed to purchase the Doolittle Theatre in 1999 from UCLA. The theater had been owned by Howard Hughes in the early 1930s, then later was renamed the Huntington Hartford Theater when purchased in 1954 by philanthropist Huntington Hartford, then later the Doolittle Theater. The process from agreement to opening took over four years. The facility in Hollywood was officially renamed the Ricardo Montalbán Theatre in a May 11, 2004, ceremony. The event was attended by numerous celebrities, including Ed Begley Jr. representing the Screen Actors Guild, Valerie Harper, Loni Anderson, Hector Elizondo, and Robert Goulet.

When Montalbán rolled onto the stage in his wheelchair, he repeated "the five stages of the actor" (originally coined by Jack Elam to describe the course of his own career). Montalbán had become famous for using the self-deprecating joke in interviews and in public speeches:
 Who is Ricardo Montalbán?
 Get me Ricardo Montalbán.
 Get me a Ricardo Montalbán type.
 Get me a young Ricardo Montalbán.
 Who is Ricardo Montalbán?

He then jokingly added two more stages: 
 "Wait a minute—isn't that What's-his-name?", referring to his role in the Spy Kids movies
 "Who the hell is that?", believing that to be the reaction of people seeing his name on the theater marquee.

Montalbán spoke about the goal of the Nosotros organization:

Personal life

After seeing Georgiana Young in The Story of Alexander Graham Bell (1939), then-18-year-old Montalbán became enamored of the 15-year-old Younghalf-sister of actresses Sally Blane, Polly Ann Young, and Loretta Young. Montalbán had started his own stage and film career by the time the two met on a blind date; Montalbán proposed that evening, later stating "It took a week to persuade her." They married in 1944, and had four children together: Laura, Mark, Anita and Victor. After 63 years of marriage, Young died in 2007, at age 83.
 
Montalbán was a practicing Catholic, once claiming that his religion was the most important thing in his life. He was a member of the Good Shepherd Parish and the Catholic Motion Picture Guild in Beverly Hills, California. In 1998, Pope John Paul II made him a Knight of the Order of St. Gregory the Great (KSG), the highest honor a Roman Catholic lay person can receive from the Church. In 1986, in honor of the 100th anniversary of the Statue of Liberty, he recorded a public service announcement celebrating the United States' generosity and hospitality to him as a foreign-born actor.

His autobiography Reflections: A Life in Two Worlds was published in January 1980 by Doubleday.

For many years, he followed a strict diet and physical training regimen, giving him an enviable physique. After the release of The Wrath of Khan, director Nicholas Meyer was quick to quell any rumors of Montalbán's using prosthetics during filming.

Death
On January 14, 2009, Montalbán died at his home in Los Angeles at the age of 88. According to his son-in-law, Gilbert Smith, he died of "complications from advancing age". The precise cause of death was revealed to be congestive heart failure. He is buried in the Holy Cross Cemetery in Culver City, California.

In the film My Dinner with Hervé (2018), Montalbán was played by Andy García.

Filmography

Film

Television

References

Further reading

External links
 
 
 
 
 
 Ricardo Montalbán – Archive of American Television interview
 Catholics in Media Associates Lifetime Achievement Award
 Image of Ricardo Montalbán and Florence Henderson in a theater production of "The King and I" in Los Angeles, California, 1965. Los Angeles Times Photographic Archive (Collection 1429). UCLA Library Special Collections, Charles E. Young Research Library, University of California, Los Angeles.

1920 births
2009 deaths
20th-century Mexican male actors
21st-century Mexican male actors
Belmont High School (Los Angeles) alumni
Burials at Holy Cross Cemetery, Culver City
California Republicans
Chrysler people
Emmy Award winners
Hispanic and Latino American male actors
Knights of St. Gregory the Great
Male actors from Mexico City
Male actors from Los Angeles
Metro-Goldwyn-Mayer contract players
Mexican emigrants to the United States
Mexican male film actors
Mexican male stage actors
Mexican male television actors
Mexican male voice actors
Mexican people of Spanish descent
Mexican Roman Catholics